Hamida is an Arabic given name that means praiseworthy, and it is the feminine form of the name
Hamid. In Azerbaijani it becomes Həmidə. It may refer to:

People
DJ Hamida, Moroccan DJ and record producer based in France

Given name
Hamida Addèche (born 1932), French long-distance runner
Hamida al-Attas (born 1934), the mother of Osama bin Laden
Hamida Banu Begum (1527–1604), wife of the second Mughal Emperor, Humayun, and the mother of Mughal Emperor, Akbar
Hamida Banu Shova, founder and chairperson of Queens University, Bangladesh
Hamida Barmaki (1970–2011) Afghan law professor and human rights activist
Hamida Djandoubi (1949–1977), the last person to be guillotined in France, at Baumettes Prison in Marseille
Hamida Ghafour, Canadian journalist and author of Afghan origin
Hamida Habibullah (1916–2018), Indian parliamentarian, educationist and social worker
Hamida Al-Habsi (born 1987), Omani shot putter and discus thrower
Hamida Javanshir (1873–1955), Azerbaijani philanthropist and women's rights activist
Hamida Khuhro (1936–2017), Pakistani politician and historian Sindh government minister
Hamida Nana (born 1946), Syrian writer and journalist
Hamida Rania Nefsi (born 1997), Algerian swimmer
Hamida Omarova (born 1957), Azerbaijani actress
Hamida Pahalwan, Indian wrestler in Radhanpur during the 1930s

Middle name
 K. J. Hamida Khanam, Bangladeshi politician.

Ben / Bin / Bani / Banu Hamida
Bani Hamida, a semi-nomadic bedouin tribe that controlled much of the land East of the Dead Sea before the establishment of the emirate of Transjordan
Adil Mabrouk Bin Hamida, citizen of Tunisia, former extrajudicial detainee at the U.S. Guantanamo Bay detainment camps, in Cuba
Mongi Ben Hamida (1928–2003), Tunisian neurologist and neuropsychiatrist

Fictional characters
 Ĥamida, a character in the film A Girl Named Maĥmood

See also
 Hamidah (disambiguation)

Arabic feminine given names
Bosnian feminine given names